Berthe Erza was a French-Algerian dramatic soprano singer.

Early life
Erza was born to French parents in Algiers. She studied voice in Italy and France. In 1920, she moved to the United States with her vocal coach, Isidore Braggiotti (father of dancer Francesca Braggiotti).

Career
Erza was a featured singer with the Pasdeloup Orchestra in Paris under Rhené-Baton, and spent three seasons with the Concerts Classiques of Monte Carlo. In 1921 she sang at a concert to benefit a French village, Misery-sur-Somme, after World War I. She made an "American debut" in July 1921, then her "formal debut" in America, at the Aeolian Hall in New York City in 1922, and had another New York concert billed as a  "debut" in 1930, at the Biltmore Theatre. The New York Times called her "a well-schooled musician with a flair for the exotic" in 1931. She sang at Carnegie Hall later that year, sharing the stage with Hugh Ross and the chorus of the Schola Cantorum, Nelson Eddy, and others, for the American premiere of Karol Szymanowski's Stabat Mater.

She made at least two recordings for Victor in 1920. She taught vocal music in Brooklyn in the 1930s, at the Chase School, on the same music faculty as composer Harrison Kerr.

References

External links 

 Berthe Erza at Discography of American Historical Recordings at University of California, Santa Barbara

Algerian opera singers
Operatic sopranos
20th-century Algerian women singers
20th-century women opera singers
People from Algiers
Year of birth missing
Year of death missing